William Hodgins (29 December 189425 June 1920) was an Irish Gaelic footballer. His championship career with the Wexford senior team lasted four seasons from 1917 until 1920.

Honours

Wexford
All-Ireland Senior Football Championship (2): 1917, 1918
Leinster Senior Football Championship (2): 1917, 1918

References

1894 births
1920 deaths
Wexford inter-county Gaelic footballers